Robert Newlyn (1597–1688) was an English clergyman and academic. He was president of Corpus Christi College, Oxford, from 1640 to 1648, was expelled by the parliamentary visitation of Oxford, and returned as president in 1660.

Life

He was born in Priors Dean, Hampshire. He matriculated at Oxford in 1614 and graduated B.A. at Corpus Christi, in 1616, M.A. in 1620. He became a Fellow of his college in 1622.  He was B.D. in 1628, and D.D. in 1640.

He became rector of Ham, Wiltshire in 1643. In 1659 he married Jane, daughter of Daniel Collins and William Dring. They had no children, but his second presidency was noted for the conspicuous nepotism Newlyn applied to admissions and college posts. He was rector of Wroughton, Wiltshire from 1660.

References
Thomas Fowler (1893), The History of Corpus Christi College

Notes

1597 births
1688 deaths
17th-century English Anglican priests
Presidents of Corpus Christi College, Oxford